The 1967 National Invitation Tournament was a single-elimination postseason college basketball tournament. Fourteen National Collegiate Athletic Association NCAA Division I teams participated in the tournament. Southern Illinois, in its first season of Division I basketball, defeated Marquette 71–56 in the championship game.  SIU's Walt Frazier was the tournament MOP.

Selected teams
Below is a list of the 14 teams selected for the tournament.

 Duke
 Marquette
 Marshall
 Memphis
 Nebraska
 New Mexico
 Providence
 Rutgers
 Saint Peter's
 Southern Illinois
 Syracuse
 Tulsa
 Utah State
 Villanova

Bracket
Below is the tournament bracket.

See also
 1967 NCAA University Division basketball tournament
 1967 NCAA College Division basketball tournament
 1967 NAIA Division I men's basketball tournament

References

National Invitation
National Invitation Tournament
1960s in Manhattan
Basketball in New York City
College sports in New York City
Madison Square Garden
National Invitation Tournament
National Invitation Tournament
Sports competitions in New York City
Sports in Manhattan